Gordon John Davies (born 3 August 1955) is a Welsh former international footballer. He is the record goalscorer for Fulham and earned 16 caps for Wales between 1979 and 1986, scoring 2 international goals.

Club career
Davies, a forward, played club football for a number of English clubs, including Fulham, Manchester City and Chelsea.

He joined Fulham in 1978 from Merthyr Tydfil F.C., and spent six years with the London club. After a season with Chelsea he was signed by Manchester City for a fee of £100,000. He made his City debut on 12 October 1985 against Watford, and his first goal came two days later in a 6–1 victory over Leeds United in the Full Members Cup; Davies scored a hat-trick that day. Once Billy McNeill departed as City manager Davies' days at the club were numbered and his final City match was against Southend United in the Football League Cup, and he returned to Fulham in October 1986.

His second spell at Fulham lasted five years, at the end of which he had become Fulham's record goalscorer, with 178 goals in 450 appearances. At the end of his Fulham career, the club granted him a testimonial which was played against a Wales XI.

Davies left Fulham in 1991 and went back to Wales to join Wrexham. He became a part of FA Cup history when the minnows beat giants Arsenal in one of the competition's biggest ever shocks. He left the Welsh club in February 1992 to take up an offer of management in Norway with Tornado FK, signing on as player-manager. In the summer of 1992 he returned to the UK and signed for Northwich Victoria where he spent one season and retired from the game the following close season.  He is still a popular and frequent guest at Craven Cottage matches.

International career
Davies made his Wales debut on 21 November 1979 against Turkey. He made 16 Wales appearances in total (scoring two goals) with his last game against Republic of Ireland on 26 March 1986.

International goals

References

1955 births
Association football forwards
English Football League players
Fulham F.C. players
Chelsea F.C. players
Manchester City F.C. players
Wrexham A.F.C. players
Northwich Victoria F.C. players
Merthyr Tydfil F.C. players
Wales international footballers
Welsh footballers
Living people